The Vortech Skylark is an American helicopter produced by Vortech of Fallston, Maryland. The aircraft is supplied in the form of plans for amateur construction. Vortech also supplies rotor blades for the design.

Design and development
The Skylark was designed to comply with the US Experimental - Amateur-built aircraft rules. It features a single main rotor, a single-seat open cockpit without a windshield, skid-type landing gear and a twin cylinder, liquid-cooled, in-line two-stroke, carbureted  Hirth 3503 aircraft engine. The twin cylinder, liquid-cooled, in-line two-stroke,  Rotax 582 has also been used. A cockpit enclosure was optional.

The aircraft fuselage is made from welded 4130 steel tubing, with an aluminium tail boom. Its  diameter two-bladed rotor employs a NACA 0012 airfoil. The main transmission is of belt and chain type, whileteh tail rotor is driven by a long shaft. The control system consists of conventional helicopters controls.

The manufacturer estimates the construction time as 300 hours.

Operational history
By 2005 the company reported that 5 were completed and flying.

By January 2015 no examples were registered in the United States with the Federal Aviation Administration, although one had been registered at one time.

Specifications (Skylark)

See also
List of rotorcraft

References

External links

Skylark
1980s United States sport aircraft
1980s United States helicopters
Homebuilt aircraft
Single-engined piston helicopters